Dragomirești-Vale is a commune in the southwestern part of Ilfov County, Muntenia, Romania. Its name is derived from Dragomir, a Romanian name of Slavic origin (from Драгомир, which means "precious and peaceful"), the suffix -ești, and  noun Vale, which means "valley".

A medium-size commune, it is composed of 3 villages: Dragomirești-Deal, Dragomirești-Vale and Zurbaua.

The nearest airports are Henri Coandă International Airport, Otopeni (30 km away), and Aurel Vlaicu International Airport (25 km away).

References

Communes in Ilfov County
Localities in Muntenia

ro:Dragomirești-Vale, Ilfov